The Sound and the Fury is a novel by the American author William Faulkner. It employs several narrative styles, including stream of consciousness. Published in 1929, The Sound and the Fury was Faulkner's fourth novel, and was not immediately successful. In 1931, however, when Faulkner's sixth novel, Sanctuary, was published—a sensationalist story, which Faulkner later said was written only for money—The Sound and the Fury also became commercially successful, and Faulkner began to receive critical attention.

Overview 
The Sound and the Fury is set in Jefferson, Mississippi, in the first third of the 20th century. The novel centers on the Compson family, former Southern aristocrats who are struggling to deal with the dissolution of their family and its reputation. Over the course of the 30 years or so related in the novel, the family falls into financial ruin, loses its religious faith and the respect of the town of Jefferson, and many of them die tragically.

The novel is separated into four narratives. The first, reflecting events occurring and consequent thoughts and memories on April 7, 1928, is written in the voice and from the perspective of Benjamin "Benjy" Compson, an intellectually disabled 33-year-old man.  Benjy's section is characterized by a disjointed narrative style with frequent chronological leaps.

The second section, taking place on June 2, 1910, focuses on Quentin Compson, Benjy's older brother, and the events leading up to Quentin's suicide. This section is written in the stream-of-consciousness style and also contains frequent chronological leaps.

In the third section, set a day before the first on April 6, 1928, Faulkner writes from the point of view of Jason, Quentin's cynical younger brother. 

In the fourth section, set a day after the first on April 8, 1928, Faulkner introduces a third-person omniscient point of view. This last section primarily focuses on Dilsey, one of the Compsons' black servants, and her relations with Jason and "Miss" Quentin Compson (daughter of Quentin's sister Caddy), as Dilsey contemplates the thoughts and deeds of everyone in the Compson family.

In 1945, Faulkner wrote a "Compson Appendix" to be included with future printings of The Sound and the Fury. It contains a 30-page history of the Compson family from 1699 to 1945.

Plot

Part 1: April 7, 1928
The first section of the novel is narrated by Benjamin "Benjy" Compson, a source of shame to the family (primarily his mother) due to his diminished mental capacity; the only characters who show genuine care for him are Caddy, his older sister, and Dilsey, a matronly family retainer. His narrative voice is characterized predominantly by its nonlinearity: spanning the period 1898–1928, Benjy's narrative is a series of non-chronological events presented in a stream of consciousness. The presence of italics in Benjy's section indicates significant shifts in the narrative. Originally Faulkner conceived the use of different colors of ink to signify chronological breaks. This nonlinearity makes the style of this section particularly challenging, but Benjy's style develops a cadence that, while not chronologically coherent, provides unbiased insight into many characters' true motivations.  Moreover, Benjy's caretaker changes to indicate the time period: Luster in the present, T.P. in Benjy's teenage years, and Versh during Benjy's infancy and childhood.

In this section we see Benjy's three passions: fire, the golf course on land that used to belong to the Compson family, and his sister Caddy. But by 1928 Caddy has been banished from the Compson home after her husband divorced her because her child was not his, and the family has had to sell pastureland to a local golf club to finance Quentin's Harvard education. In the opening scene, Benjy, accompanied by Luster, a servant boy, watches golfers on the nearby golf course as he waits to hear them call "caddie"—the name of his favorite sibling. When one of them calls for his golf caddie, Benjy's mind embarks on a whirlwind course of memories of his sister, Caddy, focusing on one critical scene. In 1898 when their grandmother died, the four Compson children were forced to play outside during the funeral. In order to see what was going on inside, Caddy climbed a tree in the yard, and while looking inside, her brothers — Quentin, Jason and Benjy — looked up and noticed that her underwear was muddy. This is Benjy's first memory, and he associates Caddy with trees throughout the rest of his arc, often saying that she smells like trees. Other crucial memories in this section are Benjy's change of name (originally "Maury", after his maternal uncle, a wastrel) in 1900 upon the discovery of his disability; the marriage and divorce of Caddy (1910), and Benjy's castration, resulting from an attack on a girl that is alluded to briefly within this chapter when a gate is left unlatched and Benjy is out unsupervised.

Part 2: June 2, 1910
Quentin, the most intelligent of the Compson children, gives the novel's best example of Faulkner's narrative technique. We see him as a freshman at Harvard, wandering the streets of Cambridge, contemplating death, and remembering his family's estrangement from his sister Caddy. Like the first section, its narrative is not strictly linear, though the two interweaving threads, of Quentin at Harvard on the one hand, and of his memories on the other, are clearly discernible.

Quentin's main obsession is Caddy's virginity and purity. He is obsessed with Southern ideals of chivalry and is strongly protective of women, especially his sister. When Caddy engages in sexual promiscuity, Quentin is horrified. He turns to his father for help and counsel, but the pragmatic Mr. Compson tells him that virginity is invented by men and should not be taken seriously. He also tells Quentin that time will heal all. Quentin spends much of his time trying to prove his father wrong, but is unable to do so. Shortly before Quentin leaves for Harvard in the fall of 1909, Caddy becomes pregnant by a lover she is unable to identify, perhaps Dalton Ames, whom Quentin confronts. The two fight, with Quentin losing disgracefully and Caddy vowing, for Quentin's sake, never to speak to Dalton again. Quentin tells his father that they have committed incest, but his father knows that he is lying: "and he did you try to make her do it and i i was afraid to i was afraid she might and then it wouldn't do any good" (112). Quentin's idea of incest is shaped by the idea that, if they "could just have done something so dreadful that they would have fled hell except us" (51), he could protect his sister by joining her in whatever punishment she might have to endure. In his mind, he feels a need to take responsibility for Caddy's sin.

Pregnant and alone, Caddy then marries Herbert Head, whom Quentin finds repulsive, but Caddy is resolute: she must marry before the birth of her child. Herbert finds out that the child is not his, and sends Caddy and her new daughter away in shame. He also rescinds his offer of a bank job to Caddy's brother, Jason, who holds Caddy responsible for this misfortune and never forgives her. Quentin's wanderings through Harvard (as he cuts classes) follow the pattern of his heartbreak over losing Caddy. For instance, he meets a small Italian immigrant girl who speaks no English. Significantly, he calls her "sister" and spends much of the day trying to communicate with her, and to care for her by finding her home, to no avail. He thinks sadly of the downfall and squalor of the South after the American Civil War. Tormented by his conflicting thoughts and emotions, Quentin commits suicide by drowning.

Part 3: April 6, 1928
The third section is narrated by Jason, the third child and his mother Caroline's favorite. Ironically, he is the only child who does not want, need, or return her love. It takes place the day before Benjy's section, on Good Friday. Of the three brothers' sections, Jason's is the most straightforward, reflecting his single-minded desire for material wealth. This desire is made evident by his (bad) investments in the cotton market, which symbolize the financial decline of the South. 

By 1928, Jason is the economic foundation of the family after his father's death. He supports his mother, Benjy, and Miss Quentin (daughter of Caddy, the second child), as well as the family's servants. His role makes him bitter and cynical, with little of the passionate sensitivity that we see in his older brother and sister. He goes so far as to blackmail Caddy into making him Miss Quentin's sole guardian, then uses that role to steal the support payments that Caddy sends for her daughter, amounting to tens of thousands of dollars over 15 years (to maintain a mistress in Memphis and play the stock market). Miss Quentin and her boyfriend/lover recoup some of the funds which Jason absconded by stealing his strongbox, in which he kept thousands of dollars in cash. 

This is the first section that is narrated in a linear fashion. It follows the course of Good Friday, a day in which Jason decides to leave work to search for Miss Quentin, who has run away again, seemingly in pursuit of mischief. Here we see most immediately the conflict between the two predominant traits of the Compson family, which Caroline attributes to the difference between her blood and her husband's: on the one hand, Miss Quentin's recklessness and passion, inherited from her grandfather and, ultimately, the Compson side; on the other, Jason's ruthless cynicism, drawn from his mother's side. This section also gives us the clearest image of domestic life in the Compson household, which for Jason and the servants means the care of the hypochondriac Caroline and of Benjy.

Part 4: April 8, 1928
April 8, 1928, is Easter Sunday. This section, the only one without a single first-person narrator, focuses on Dilsey, the powerful matriarch of the black family servants. She, in contrast to the declining Compsons, draws a great deal of strength from her faith, standing as a proud figure amid a dying family. On this Easter Sunday, Dilsey takes her family and Benjy to the "colored" church. Through her we sense the consequences of the decadence and depravity in which the Compsons have lived for decades. Dilsey is mistreated and abused, but nevertheless remains loyal. She, with the help of her grandson Luster, cares for Benjy, as she takes him to church and tries to bring him to salvation. The preacher's sermon inspires her to weep for the Compson family, reminding her that she's seen the family through its destruction, which she is now witnessing.

Meanwhile, the tension between Jason and Miss Quentin reaches its inevitable conclusion. The family discovers that Miss Quentin has run away in the middle of the night with a carnival worker, having found the strongbox in which Jason had a hidden collection of cash and taken both her money (the support from Caddy, which Jason had stolen) and her money-obsessed uncle's life savings. Jason calls the police and tells them that his money has been stolen, but since it would mean admitting embezzling Quentin's money he doesn't press the issue. He therefore sets off once again to find her on his own, but loses her trail in nearby Mottson, and gives her up as gone for good.

After church, Dilsey allows her grandson Luster to drive Benjy in the family's decrepit horse and carriage to the graveyard.  Luster, disregarding Benjy's set routine, drives the wrong way around a monument, provoking Benjy into hysterical sobbing. Jason suddenly appears, slaps Luster, turns the carriage around, and, in an attempt to quiet Benjy, hits Benjy, breaking his flower stalk, while screaming "Shut up!" After Jason gets off the carriage and Luster heads home, Benjy suddenly becomes silent. Luster turns around to look at Benjy and sees Benjy holding his drooping flower. Benjy's eyes are "empty and blue and serene again."

Appendix: Compson: 1699–1945
In 1945, Faulkner wrote an appendix to the novel to be published in the then-forthcoming anthology The Portable Faulkner, edited by Malcolm Cowley. At Faulkner's behest, however, subsequent printings of The Sound and the Fury frequently contain the appendix at the end of the book; it is sometimes referred to as the fifth part. Having been written sixteen years after The Sound and the Fury, the appendix presents some textual differences from the novel, but serves to clarify the novel's opaque story.

The appendix is presented as a complete history of the Compson family lineage, beginning with the arrival of their ancestor Quentin Maclachlan in America in 1779 and continuing through 1945, including events that transpired after the novel (which takes place in 1928). In particular, the appendix reveals that Caroline Bascomb Compson died in 1933, at which time Jason had Benjy committed to the state asylum in Jackson, fired the black servants, sold the last of the Compson land, and moved into an apartment above his farming supply store. It is also revealed that Jason had himself declared Benjy's legal guardian many years ago, without their mother's knowledge, and used this status to have Benjy castrated.

The appendix also reveals the fate of Caddy, last seen in the novel when her daughter Quentin is still a baby. After marrying and divorcing a second time (to a "minor moving picture magnate" in Hollywood), Caddy moved to Paris, where she lived at the time of the German occupation. In 1943, the librarian of Yoknapatawpha County discovered a magazine photograph of Caddy in the company of a German staff general and attempted separately to recruit both Jason and Dilsey to save her; Jason, at first acknowledging that the photo was of his sister, denied that it was she after realizing the librarian wanted his help, while Dilsey pretended to be unable to see the picture at all. The librarian later realizes that while Jason remains cold and unsympathetic towards Caddy, Dilsey simply understands that Caddy neither wants nor needs to be saved from the Germans, because nothing else remains for her.

The appendix concludes with an accounting for the black family who worked as servants to the Compsons. Unlike the entries for the Compsons themselves, which are lengthy, detailed, and told with an omniscient narrative perspective, the servants' entries are simple and succinct. Dilsey's entry, the final in the appendix, consists of two words: "They endured."

Characters

 Jason Compson III – father of the Compson family, a lawyer who attended the University of the South: a pessimist and alcoholic, with cynical opinions that torment his son, Quentin. He also narrates several chapters of Absalom, Absalom!
 Caroline Bascomb Compson – wife of Jason Compson III: a self-absorbed neurotic who has never shown affection for any of her children except Jason, whom she seems to like only because he takes after her side of the family. In her old age she has become an abusive hypochondriac.
 Quentin Compson III – the oldest Compson child: passionate and neurotic, he commits suicide as the tragic culmination of the damaging influence of his father's pessimistic philosophy and his inability to cope with his sister's sexual promiscuity. He is also a character in Absalom, Absalom! The bridge over the Charles River, where he commits suicide in the novel, bears a plaque to commemorate the character's life and death.
 Candace "Caddy" Compson – the second Compson child, strong-willed yet caring. Benjy's only real caregiver and Quentin's best friend. According to Faulkner, Caddy is the true hero of the novel. Caddy never develops a voice; rather, her brothers' emotions towards her provide the development of her character.
 Jason Compson IV – the bitter, openly racist third child who is troubled by monetary debt and sexual frustration. He works at a farming goods store owned by a man named Earl and becomes head of the household in 1912.  Has been embezzling Miss Quentin's support payments for years.
 Benjamin (nicknamed Benjy, born Maury) Compson – the mentally disabled fourth child, who is a constant source of shame and grief for his family, especially his mother, who insisted on his name change to Benjamin. Caddy is the only family member who shows any genuine love towards him. Luster, albeit begrudgingly, shows concern for him occasionally, but usually out of obligation. Has an almost animal-like "sixth sense" about people, as he was able to tell that Caddy had lost her virginity just from her smell. The model for Benjy's character may have had its beginning in the 1925 New Orleans Times Picayune sketch by Faulkner entitled "The Kingdom of God".
 Dilsey Gibson – the matriarch of the servant family, which includes her own three children — Versh, Frony, and T.P. — and her grandchild Luster (Frony's son); they serve as Benjamin's caretakers throughout his life. An observer of the Compson family's decline.
 Miss Quentin Compson – daughter of Caddy who goes to live with the Compsons when Herbert divorces Caddy. She is wild and promiscuous, and eventually runs away from home. Often referred to as "Quentin II" or "Miss Quentin" by readers to distinguish her from her uncle, for whom she was named.

Style and structure 

The four parts of the novel relate many of the same episodes, each from a different point of view and therefore with emphasis on different themes and events. This interweaving and nonlinear structure makes any true synopsis of the novel difficult, especially since the narrators are all unreliable in their own way, making their accounts not necessarily trustworthy at all times. Also in this novel, Faulkner uses italics to indicate points in each section where the narrative is moving into a significant moment in the past. The use of these italics can be confusing, however, as time shifts are not always marked by the use of italics, and periods of different time in each section do not necessarily stay in italics for the duration of the flashback. Thus, these time shifts can often be jarring and confusing, and require particularly close reading.

The Sound and The Fury 

When Faulkner began writing the story that would develop into The Sound and the Fury, it "was tentatively titled ‘Twilight,’ [and] narrated by a fourth Compson child," but as the story progressed into a larger work, he renamed it, drawing its title from Macbeth's famous soliloquy from act 5, scene 5 of William Shakespeare's Macbeth:

Tomorrow and tomorrow and tomorrow,
Creeps in this petty pace from day to day
To the last syllable of recorded time,
And all our yesterdays have lighted fools
The way to dusty death. Out, out, brief candle!
Life's but a walking shadow, a poor player
That struts and frets his hour upon the stage
And then is heard no more: it is a tale
Told by an idiot, full of sound and fury,
Signifying nothing.

Immediately obvious is the notion of a "tale told by an idiot," in this case Benjy, whose view of the Compsons' story opens the novel. The idea can be extended also to Quentin and Jason, whose narratives display their own varieties of idiocy.  More to the point, the novel recounts "the way to dusty death" of a traditional upper-class Southern family. The last line is, perhaps, the most meaningful: Faulkner said in his Nobel Prize in Literature acceptance speech that people must write about things that come from the heart, "universal truths." Otherwise, they signify nothing.

Reception
Upon publication the influential critic Clifton Fadiman dismissed the novel, arguing in The Nation that "the theme and the characters are trivial, unworthy of the enormous and complex craftsmanship expended on them." But The Sound and the Fury ultimately went on to achieve a prominent place among the greatest of American novels, playing a role in William Faulkner's receiving the 1949 Nobel Prize in Literature.

It is nearly unanimously considered a masterpiece by literary critics and scholars, but its unconventional narrative style frequently alienates new readers. Although the vocabulary is generally basic, the stream-of-consciousness technique, which attempts to transcribe the thoughts of the narrators directly, with frequent switches in time and setting and with loose sentence structure and grammar, has made it a quintessentially difficult modernist work.

Literary significance
The Sound and the Fury is a widely influential work of literature. Faulkner has been praised for his ability to recreate the thought process of the human mind. In addition, it is viewed as an essential development in the stream-of-consciousness literary technique.

Adaptations
A film adaptation was released in 1959 directed by Martin Ritt and starring Yul Brynner, Joanne Woodward, Margaret Leighton, Stuart Whitman, Ethel Waters, Jack Warden, and Albert Dekker. The movie bears little resemblance to the novel.
Another adaptation, The Sound and the Fury (2014), was directed by James Franco and starred Franco as Benjy Compson, Jacob Loeb as Quentin Compson, Joey King as Miss Quentin, Tim Blake Nelson as Mr. Compson, Loretta Devine as Dilsey, Ahna O'Reilly as Caddy Compson, Scott Haze as Jason Compson, Kylen Davis as Luster, Seth Rogen as a Telegraph Operator, Danny McBride as a Sheriff, and Logan Marshall-Green as Dalton Ames. It made its premiere at the 71st Venice International Film Festival, where it screened out-of-competition.

Limited edition
In 2012, The Folio Society released an edition, limited to 1480 copies, of The Sound and the Fury. This edition is the first to use colored ink to represent different time sequences for the first section of the novel. This limited edition is also sold with a special commentary volume edited by Faulkner scholars Stephen Ross and Noel Polk. According to The Folio Society, "We can never know if this [edition] is exactly what Faulkner would have envisaged, but the result justifies his belief that coloured inks would allow readers to follow the strands of the novel more easily, without compromising the ‘thought-transference’ for which he argued so passionately."

See also 
Le Monde 100 Books of the Century

Notes

Further reading 
 
 Bleikasten, André. The Ink of Melancholy: Faulkner's Novels from The Sound and the Fury to Light in August. Bloomington: Indiana UP, 1990.
 Bleikasten, André. The Most Splendid Failure: Faulkner's The Sound and the Fury. Bloomington: Indiana UP, 1976.
 Brooks, Cleanth. William Faulkner: The Yoknapatawpha Country. New Haven: Yale UP, 1963.
 
 Cowan, Michael H., ed. Twentieth century interpretations of The sound and the fury: a collection of critical essays. Englewood Cliffs, N.J.: Prentice-Hall, 1968.
 
 Davis, Thadious M. Faulkner's "Negro": Art and the Southern Context. Baton Rouge: Louisiana State UP, 1983.
 
 Gunn, Giles. "Faulkner's Heterodoxy: Faith and Family in The Sound and the Fury". Faulkner and Religion: Faulkner and Yoknapatawpha, 1989. Ed. Doreen Fowler and Ann J. Abadie. Jackson: UP of Mississippi, 1991. 44–64.
 Hagood, Taylor, ed. (2014). The Sound and the Fury, by William Faulkner. Critical Insights. Ipswich, MA: Salem Press.
 
 
 Howe, Irving. William Faulkner: A Critical Study. 3d ed. Chicago: U of Chicago P, 1975.
 Kartiganer, Donald M. The Fragile Thread: The Meaning of Form in Faulkner's Novels. Amherst: University of Massachusetts Press, 1979.
 Marshall, Alexander J.,  III. "The Dream Deferred: William Faulkner's Metaphysics of Absence". Faulkner and Religion: Faulkner and Yoknapatawpha, 1989. Ed. Doreen Fowler and Ann J. Abadie. Jackson: UP of Mississippi, 1991. 177–192.
 Matthews, John T. The Play of Faulkner's Language. Ithaca, NY: Cornell UP, 1982.
 Matthews, John T. The Sound and the Fury: Faulkner and the Lost Cause. Boston: Twayne, 1991.
 
 Polk, Noel. "Trying Not to Say: A Primer on the Language of The Sound and the Fury". New Essays on The Sound and the Fury. Ed. Noel Polk. Cambridge: Cambridge UP, 1993. 139–175.
 
 
 Ross, Stephen M. Fiction's Inexhaustible Voice: Speech and Writing in Faulkner. Athens: U of Georgia P, 1989.
 Ross, Stephen M., and Noel Polk. Reading Faulkner: "The Sound and the Fury". Jackson: UP of Mississippi, 1996.

 Sundquist, Eric J. Faulkner: The House Divided. Baltimore: Johns Hopkins UP, 1983.
 Urgo, Joseph R. "A Note on Reverend Shegog's Sermon in Faulkner's The Sound and the Fury". NMAL: Notes on Modern American Literature 8.1 (1984): item 4.
 Vickery, Olga W. The Novels of William Faulkner: A Critical Interpretation. Baton Rouge: Louisiana State UP, 1964.

External links
 
The Sound and the Fury at Digital Yoknapatawpha
Hypertext edition of The Sound and the Fury
The Sound and the Fury: A Study Guide
A comprehensive guide to Faulkner, including chronologically organized breakdowns of Benjy and Quentin's sections.
The Sound and the Fury study guide, teaching guide, themes, quotes
William Faulkner quotes
Book Drum illustrated profile of The Sound and the Fury

1929 American novels
American novels adapted into films
Fiction with unreliable narrators
Modernist novels
Novels by William Faulkner
Novels set in Mississippi
Southern Gothic novels
Fiction about suicide
Jonathan Cape books
Nonlinear narrative novels